The men's 200 metres sprint competition of the athletics events at the 2011 Pan American Games took place between the 26 and 27 of October at the Telmex Athletics Stadium. The defending Pan American Games champion is Brendan Christian of Antigua and Barbuda.

Records
Prior to this competition, the existing world and Pan American Games records were as follows:

Qualification
Each National Olympic Committee (NOC) was able to enter up to two entrants providing they had met the minimum standard (21.00) in the qualifying period (January 1, 2010 to September 14, 2011).

Schedule

Results
All times shown are in seconds.

Heats
The first round were held on October 26.  The first 4 in each heat (Q) and the next 4 fastest (q) qualify for the semifinals.

Wind:Heat 1: +1.2, Heat 2: +0.8, Heat 3: +0.6, Heat 4: +0.4, Heat +0.2

Semifinals
The semifinals were held on October 26.  The first two in each heat (Q) and the next 2 fastest (q) qualify for the final.

Wind:Heat 1: +0.2, Heat 2: +0.1, Heat 3: +0.5

Final
The final was held on October 27.

Wind: –1.0

References

Athletics at the 2011 Pan American Games
2011